This is a list of diplomatic missions of Angola.

Angola was the second country after Portugal to open a consulate in Macau following the enclave's take over by the People's Republic of China; Macau, like Angola, has a Portuguese legacy.

In October 2018, the Ministry of Foreign Affairs of Angola ordered the closure of embassies in Athens, Mexico City, and Ottawa; the mission to the Community of Portuguese Language Countries (CPLP) in Lisbon; as well as consulates general in Los Angeles, Durban, Faro, and Frankfurt.

This listing does not include honorary consulates.

Current missions

Africa

Americas

Asia

Europe

Multilateral organizations

Gallery

Closed missions

Africa

Americas

Asia

Europe

Multilateral organizations

See also

 Foreign relations of Angola
 List of diplomatic missions in Angola
 Visa policy of Angola
 Visa requirements for Angolan citizens

Notes

References

External links
Angolan Ministry of Foreign Affairs

 
Diplomatic missions
Angola